The Libertarian Party of Ontario fielded several candidates in the 1977 provincial election, none of whom were elected.  Information about these candidates may be found here.

Webster J. Webb (Wilson Heights)
Webb was twenty-eight years old at the time of the election, and worked as an insurance supervisor.  He received 174 votes (0.6%), finishing fourth against Progressive Conservative candidate David Rotenberg.

Webb is now a retirement and estate planning consultant in Manitoba.  He is an active member of the Unitarian and Universalist community.  In 2006, he compared the federal government of Stephen Harper as a "crackpot Third World dictatorship" after Harper refused to permit media access for the funeral ceremonies of soldiers killed in Afghanistan.

Footnotes

1977